Term Gp180 may refer to:
 PTPRC, an enzyme that is in humans encoded by the PTPRC gene
 Metallocarboxypeptidase D, an enzyme class